Double time is a musical metre, also known as half-time.

Double Time, Doubletime and variations may refer to:

Entertainment
 Double-Time Records, a record label
 Double Time (TV drama), a British one-off comedy drama starring James Dreyfus
 Double Time (Béla Fleck album), 1984
 Double Time (Leon Redbone album), 1976
 "Double Time" (Only Murders in the Building), a 2021 episode of the TV series Only Murders in the Building
 Doubletime, a 2007 documentary film about rope skipping

Other
 Double time, a rate of pay during overtime
Doubletime (gene)